Colin MacKay (3 February 1908 – 4 December 1989) was an Australian rules footballer who played with Fitzroy in the Victorian Football League (VFL).

Notes

External links 
		

1908 births
1989 deaths
Australian rules footballers from Victoria (Australia)
Fitzroy Football Club players